The 2021–22 season is the 114th season in the existence of LASK and the club's fifth consecutive season in the top flight of Austrian football. In addition to the domestic league, LASK are participating in this season's editions of the Austrian Cup and the UEFA Europa Conference League.

Players

First-team squad

Out on loan

Transfers

Pre-season and friendlies

Competitions

Overall record

Austrian Football Bundesliga

League table

Results summary

Results by round

Matches
The league fixtures were announced on 22 June 2021.

Austrian Cup

UEFA Europa Conference League

Third qualifying round
The draw for the third qualifying round was held on 19 July 2021.

Play-off round
The draw for the play-off round was held on 2 August 2021.

Group stage

The draw for the group stage was held on 27 August 2021.

Knockout phase

Round of 16
The round of 16 draw was held on 25 February 2022.

Notes

References

LASK seasons
LASK
2021–22 UEFA Europa Conference League participants seasons